Abolish ICE is a political movement that seeks the abolition of U.S. Immigration and Customs Enforcement (ICE). The movement gained mainstream traction in June 2018 following controversy of the Trump administration family separation policy. The movement proposes that ICE's responsibilities be subsumed by other existing immigration agencies, as was the case before its creation. Discussions are particularly focused on the enforcement wing of ICE.

History 
Immigration and Customs Enforcement was created in 2003, as part of the newly formed U.S. Department of Homeland Security (DHS). The agency's young age has been a point of discussion, with proponents of Abolish ICE arguing that the United States can easily do without an agency that has only existed for less than twenty years.
Though the agency controversially expanded under Barack Obama, frustrating advocates for immigrants' rights, its stated focus remained the deportation of those undocumented immigrants who were convicted of a crime. In practice, however, ICE had been seen to target individuals solely on the crime of having previously entering the country illegally. In 2014, the National Immigration Law Center (NILC) filed a lawsuit against ICE and DHS under the Freedom of Information Act (FOIA). The NILC obtained documents that revealed the sharing of information between ICE/DHS and State Motor Vehicle Departments for the purpose of immigration enforcement. After Trump took office in January 2017, his administration began to implement harsher immigration policies, such as denying asylum to refugees and separating undocumented children from their families, which spurred the growth of the movement. Sean McElwee, co-founder of left-wing think tank Data for Progress, is credited with popularizing the slogan via the hashtag #AbolishICE.

In August 2017, a series of protests over the agency took place in Oakland, California. However, a group of Oakland police escorted ICE and DHS agents to the site of a search, sparking controversy and protests over the sanctuary policy breach. ICE later stated that the agency was serving a federal search warrant for suspected child trafficking, and was not conducting a deportation. Conservatives criticized the protesters for interfering with the investigation.

Controversy over the Trump administration family separation policy in 2018 brought the movement into the mainstream of political discussion. Dan Canon, a Democratic candidate for congress in Indiana, was the first candidate to call for ICE to be eliminated; Randy Bryce, a Democratic congressional candidate in Wisconsin, followed soon after in April. Bryce's opponent, Paul Ryan, who was then the Speaker of the House of Representatives, said that abolishing ICE was "the craziest position I have ever seen". On June 20, at the height of the family separation controversy, protestors approached Secretary of Homeland Security Kirstjen Nielsen at a restaurant, chanting "Abolish ICE".

Alexandria Ocasio-Cortez, a democratic socialist and Democratic primary challenger to Representative Joseph Crowley, made abolishing ICE one of her top campaign issues. In the wake of her unexpected victory on June 26, the position became more widely accepted by progressive politicians, including Massachusetts senator Elizabeth Warren and Bernie Sanders. The change was particularly strong in Ocasio-Cortez's state of New York, where Senator Kirsten Gillibrand and New York City mayor Bill de Blasio quickly embraced the abolition of ICE after the win.

On June 25, Wisconsin congressman Mark Pocan announced that he would introduce legislation to dismantle ICE and establish a commission to determine how the government "can implement a humane immigration enforcement system", after visiting the Mexico–United States border and witnessing "the nation’s immigration crisis". Pocan was joined by Pramila Jayapal of Washington and Adriano Espaillat of New York in introducing the bill, the Establishing a Humane Immigration Enforcement System Act, on July 12.

Nineteen ICE agents wrote a letter to Secretary Kirstjen Nielsen asking for the ICE to be split into two separate agencies because they believe the institution inhibits their ability to do their job properly. Their proposal would separate the enforcement and removal unit, which is the subject of almost all of the controversy, from the investigations unit that focuses on issues such as fraud, human trafficking, gangs, and drug rings. They believe that sanctuary jurisdictions would be more likely to work with the investigative unit if it were separate.

Rallies in support of abolition 

Several protests, rallies, and marches—including Occupy ICE, Families Belong Together, and Women Disobey—called for the abolition of ICE and decarceration of undocumented immigrants. These rallies took place over several months in over 700 cities in the United States and around the world.

Reactions 
Trump has accused Democrats of advocating for the abolition of ICE, saying that if "you get rid of ICE, you’re going to have a country that you’re going to be afraid to walk out of your house". He predicted that Democrats would get "beaten so badly" in the 2018 midterm elections because of the issue (the Democrats gained control of the House, but the Republicans expanded their majority in the Senate in the elections). Vice President Mike Pence visited ICE's headquarters in the wake of the controversy, calling ICE and Border Patrol agents "heroes".

Most Democratic politicians, such as Senator Amy Klobuchar of Minnesota, and Vice-President Kamala Harris of California, believe that ICE should be reformed rather than abolished. Harris stated that Democrats should "critically re-examine ICE" and "think about starting from scratch" with American immigration policy, while Senator Bernie Sanders stated that Democrats should instead encourage Trump to work with them on "a national program which deals with this serious issue."

National polling by Pew Research Center in July 2018 found that ICE was one of the least popular government agencies among Americans. The same poll found that public support  of the agency was sharply partisan: 72% of Democrats hold unfavorable view of the agency, while 72% of Republicans were found to have a "favorable opinion" of the agency.

National polling by POLITICO/Morning Consult in July 2018 found that 25% of Americans favored abolishing ICE, while a majority supported keeping it. In August 2018, national polling by the Associated Press-NORC Center for Public Affairs Research found that 37% of Americans hold an unfavorable opinion of ICE. The same poll found that 24% of Americans support abolishing ICE.

Commentators have noted that U.S. Customs and Border Protection, not ICE, is responsible for border enforcement, so abolishing ICE alone would not end the ability of the United States to enforce its immigration laws, nor would it necessarily end the controversial practice of family separation that spurred support for the movement.

See also 

Police abolition movement
Criticisms of U.S. Immigration and Customs Enforcement
Electronic monitoring in the United States
Defund the police

References 

2018 in American politics
Abolition
Illegal immigration to the United States
Immigrant rights activists
Immigration-related protests
Protests against Donald Trump
U.S. Immigration and Customs Enforcement